Gawlik is a surname. Notable people with the surname include:

 Christoph Gawlik (born 1987), German ice hockey player
 Ginter Gawlik (1930–2005), Polish soccer player
 Krzysztof Gawlik (born 1965), Polish serial killer
 Stanisław Gawlik (1925–1990), Polish actor
 Weronika Gawlik (born 1986), Polish handball player
 Zbigniew Gawlik (born 1956), Polish handball player

See also
 
 Meanings of minor planet names: 22001–23000#527

Polish-language surnames